Dušan Švento (born 1 August 1985) is a Slovak former professional football midfielder who played as a left winger or left-back. He spent most of his career with Slavia and Red Bull Salzburg while representing Slovakia.

Club career
During summer 2007, Švento went to an English club Derby County for a trial and to take a look at the club's facilities. More English based clubs were interested. However, this interest ended as he damaged his knee ligaments after returning to Prague. He underwent surgery and was out for almost a year.

On 16 June 2009, Švento joined Red Bull Salzburg after signing a three-year contract for a transfer fee of €2 million.

In June 2016, he returned to Slavia Prague.

In early February 2019, it was announced that Švento would rejoin Red Bull Salzburg, however, he would no longer be an active player. Instead, he undertook the role of U12 manager.

International career
Švento made his international debut for Slovakia in the friendly match against Malta on 15 August 2006, under coach Dušan Galis. He scored his first goal in the national team in an away game against Wales (5–1 win) on 7 October 2006.

References

External links
 Player profile at official club website
 
 

1985 births
Living people
Sportspeople from Ružomberok
Slovak footballers
Slovakia under-21 international footballers
Slovakia international footballers
Association football wingers
MFK Ružomberok players
SK Slavia Prague players
FC Red Bull Salzburg players
1. FC Köln players
Slovak Super Liga players
Czech First League players
Austrian Football Bundesliga players
Bundesliga players
UEFA Euro 2016 players
Slovak expatriate footballers
Slovak expatriate sportspeople in the Czech Republic
Slovak expatriate sportspeople in Austria
Slovak expatriate sportspeople in Germany
Expatriate footballers in the Czech Republic
Expatriate footballers in Austria
Expatriate footballers in Germany
Slovak football managers
Slovak expatriate football managers
Expatriate football managers in Austria